Plaza de Toros de Pamplona is a bullring in Pamplona, Spain. It is currently used for bull fighting, sporting or cultural events and music concerts.

Built in 1922, the stadium holds 19,720 people. It is the end point of the famous Running of the bulls during the festival of San Fermín.

During the first months of 1939, towards the end of Spanish Civil War, it housed a Francoist concentration camp with a capacity of 3000 Republican prisoners.

Citations 

Pamplona
Francoist concentration camps
Music venues in Spain
Sports venues in Navarre